Darío Raúl Fabbro (born 11 March 1976) is an Argentine former professional footballer who played in the MLS for Kansas City Wizards and New England Revolution. He later played in Honduras for Platense and in Chile for Deportes Concepción.

Personal life
His brother is Jonathan Fabbro.

External links
 Darío Fabbro at BDFA.com.ar 
 Darío Fabbro – Argentine Primera statistics at Fútbol XXI 
 Player profile at SI.com

1976 births
Living people
Sportspeople from Córdoba Province, Argentina
Argentine footballers
Argentine expatriate footballers
Godoy Cruz Antonio Tomba footballers
Club Atlético Huracán footballers
Club Almagro players
C.S. Emelec footballers
Deportes Concepción (Chile) footballers
Sporting Kansas City players
New England Revolution players
Platense F.C. players
Expatriate footballers in Chile
Expatriate footballers in Ecuador
Expatriate footballers in Honduras
Chilean Primera División players
Argentine Primera División players
Liga Nacional de Fútbol Profesional de Honduras players
Major League Soccer players
Association football forwards